Arlington is a neighborhood and census-designated place (CDP) in the town of Poughkeepsie, Dutchess County, New York, United States. At the 2010 census, the CDP population was 4,061.

Arlington is a suburb of the neighboring city of Poughkeepsie. It is part of the Poughkeepsie–Newburgh–Middletown, NY Metropolitan Statistical Area as well as the larger New York–Newark–Bridgeport, NY-NJ-CT-PA Combined Statistical Area.

Geography
Arlington is located at  (41.694943, -73.892054), in the north-central part of the town of Poughkeepsie. It is bordered to the west by the city of Poughkeepsie.

Demographics

At the 2010 census, there were 4,061 people, 1,222 households and 721 families residing in the CDP. The population density was 6,061.2 per square mile (2,348.4/km). There were 1,339 housing units at an average density of 1,998.5/sq mi (774.0/km). The racial makeup of the CDP was 63.4% White, 16.4% African American, 0.9% Native American, 8.1% Asian, 5.4% some other race, and 5.9% from two or more races. Hispanic or Latino of any race were 14.1% of the population.

There were 1,222 households, of which 33.5% had children under the age of 18 living with them, 37.3% were headed by married couples living together, 16.0% had a female householder with no husband present, and 41.0% were non-families. 34.6% of all households were made up of individuals, and 10.3% were someone living alone who was 65 years of age or older. The average household size was 2.43, and the average family size was 3.19.

18.6% of the population were under the age of 18, 34.2% from 18 to 24, 21.0% from 25 to 44, 18.5% from 45 to 64, and 7.9% who were 65 years of age or older. The median age was 22.9 years. For every 100 females, there were 83.3 males. For every 100 females age 18 and over, there were 80.6 males.

For the period 2009 through 2013, the estimated median household income was $41,679, and the median family income was $56,250. Male full-time workers had a median income of $41,617 and females $35,459. The per capita income was $21,123. About 11.6% of families and 19.1% of the population were below the poverty line, including 21.5% of those under age 18 and 22.7% of those age 65 or over.

All of Vassar College is in 12604 which is in the CDP.

See also

Arlington Fire District

References

External links
 Poughkeepsie Public Library District

Poughkeepsie, New York
Census-designated places in New York (state)
Hamlets in New York (state)
Poughkeepsie–Newburgh–Middletown metropolitan area
Census-designated places in Dutchess County, New York
Hamlets in Dutchess County, New York